SoulRain 21 is the second album by progressive metal band Wastefall.

Track listing
Disc I
 Soulrain (02:55)
 Stunned To The World (05:06)
 Empty Haven (07:19)
 Lullaby For The Gods (06:40)
 Lesser (06:46)
 Live With It (05:28)
 Summerlonging Angels (04:55)
 Self-Extinction Project (05:13)
 Riot Of Oblivion (10:34)
 21 (05:03)

Disc II
 Fountains Of Fire (05:56) - (bonus)
 Numb Lake (05:16) - (bonus)
 Stunned To The World (05:06) - (video)

Total Time: 71:11

Line up
Domenik Papaemmanouil / lead vocals, guitars
Alex Katsiyannis / guitars, vocals
Christos Kyrkilis / keyboards
Matthew Dakoutros / violin
Nick Valentzis / bass guitar
Kostis Papaleksopoulos / drums

External links
Album review on Metal Storm

2004 albums
Wastefall albums